George Roumain (born March 28, 1976) is an American volleyball player. He played for the United States national team at the 2000 Summer Olympics.

References

1976 births
Living people
Olympic volleyball players of the United States
Volleyball players at the 2000 Summer Olympics
Sportspeople from Florida
American men's volleyball players
Pepperdine Waves men's volleyball players